Arenas de San Pedro is a municipality located in the province of Ávila, Castile and León, Spain. According to the 2006 census (INE), the municipality has a population of 6,682 inhabitants. Its seal depicts a large castle located in the town. The seal says "Siempre incendiada y siempre fiel", meaning "always on fire and always faithful" . This is because the town has been burned down and pillaged many times in its history.

References

Municipalities in the Province of Ávila